Oliva incrassata, the angled olive or giant olive, is a species of sea snail, a marine gastropod mollusk in the family Olividae, the olives.

Distribution
This species is widespread from California to Peru.

Habitat
These sea snails live at the low-tide level, at the outer side of sandspits.

Description
These relatively large shells are almost cylindrical, very thick, ovate, angularly swollen in the middle, with a rather short spire, a narrow and long aperture and usually with uniformly colored body whorls, except in the colummellar area. The basic color background may vary from ash-white or greyish to light yellow and brown, mottled with gray and olive, with angled transverse dark chestnut streaks and a fleshy rosy pink columellar area.

Biology
The Giant Olives are active predators. At night they search for food, while during the day they bury themselves beneath the sand and mud.

References

External links
 Conchology Inc

Bibliography
 Sowerby G. B. [first of the name] (1825). A catalogue of the shells contained in the collection of the late Earl of Tankerville. London, privately published : VII + 92 + XXXIV pp.
 Tursch B., Duchamps R. & Greifeneder D. - Studies on Olividae, XX. The pre-Lamarckian names for Oliva species. APEX 9 (2/3) 51–78, July, 1994 
 Zeigler R.F. & Porreca H.C. - Olive Shells of the World. Rochester Polychrome Press, N.Y. 1969.

incrassata
Gastropods described in 1786